The 2012–2013 Jordanian Pro League (known as the Al-Manaseer Jordanian Pro League, named after Ziad AL-Manaseer Companies Group for sponsorship reasons) was the 61st season of the top-flight football in Jordan and started on 21 August 2012. The season then finish in April 2013, Al-Faisaly was the defending champions. 
Shabab Al-Ordon  won the second title in its history. Al-Yarmouk and Shabab Al-Hussein were relegated to the Jordan League Division 1 after finishing bottom in the 2012–2013 league.

Teams

Map

League standings

Jor
1
Jordanian Pro League seasons